The 1898 Svenska Mästerskapet was the third season of Svenska Mästerskapet, the football Cup to determine the Swedish champions. Örgryte won the tournament by defeating AIK in the final with a 3–0 score.

Final

References 

Print

1898
Mas
Svenska